Susan Sloane won in the final 6–3, 6–2 against Beverly Bowes.

Seeds
A champion seed is indicated in bold text while text in italics indicates the round in which that seed was eliminated.

  Barbara Potter (quarterfinals)
  Lori McNeil (semifinals)
  Helen Kelesi (quarterfinals)
  Bettina Fulco (second round)
  Anne Minter (second round)
  Halle Cioffi (quarterfinals)
  Leila Meskhi (semifinals)
  Rosalyn Fairbank (first round)

Draw

References
 1988 Virginia Slims of Nashville Draw

Virginia Slims of Nashville
1988 WTA Tour